Lord Charles Spencer-Churchill (3 December 1794 – 28 April 1840) was a British army officer and politician. He was the second son of George Spencer-Churchill, 5th Duke of Marlborough and  Lady Susan Stewart, daughter of John Stewart, 7th Earl of Galloway.

Life and career
Spencer-Churchill entered the British Army in 1811, and he served in Spain and France. He transferred from the 85th Foot to the 75th Foot as a Captain in 1824. He purchased a Lieutenant-Colonelcy in 1827 and sold his commission in 1832. From 1818 until 1820, he also represented St. Albans in the House of Commons.

He married Ethelred Catherine Benett on 24 August 1827 and had three children:
 Susan Spencer-Churchill (d. 2 February 1898), married the Rev. and Hon. John Horatio Nelson, son of Thomas Nelson, 2nd Earl Nelson, and had issue
 Lt.-Col. Charles Henry Spencer-Churchill (27 May 1828 – 3 April 1877), married in 1862 to Rosalie Lowther, daughter of the Reverend Gorges Paulin Lowther
 Etheldreda Catherine Spencer-Churchill (15 June 1829 - 24 October 1881)
 Lucy Caroline Spencer-Churchill (29 January 1832 - 13 March 1904), married in 1880 to Rev. John Fletcher Dixon-Stewart, uncle of Rowena, Duchess of Somerset.
 John Kemys George Thomas Spencer-Churchill (27 December 1835 – 9 August 1913), married Edith Maxwell Lockhart, aunt of the novelist Jean Rhys

Spencer-Churchill was returned to Parliament in 1830 as member for the family borough of Woodstock, but went out in 1832 when the representation of that borough was reduced by the Great Reform Act. He replaced his elder brother, the Marquess of Blandford, in 1835, but having joined the Whigs was defeated in the election of 1837. Lord Charles was previously a Tory and, unlike his brother, did not support Reform.

References

F W S Craig, British Parliamentary Election Results 1832-1885 (2nd edition, Aldershot: Parliamentary Research Services, 1989)

External links 
 

1794 births
1840 deaths
Charles Spencer-Churchill
King's Shropshire Light Infantry officers
Gordon Highlanders officers
British Army personnel of the Napoleonic Wars
Conservative Party (UK) MPs for English constituencies
Tory MPs (pre-1834)
UK MPs 1818–1820
UK MPs 1830–1831
UK MPs 1831–1832
UK MPs 1835–1837
Younger sons of dukes